Lyropteryx apollonia, the Apollo metalmark, pink-dotted metalmark or blue-rayed metalmark, is a butterfly of the family Riodinidae, subfamily Riodininae, tribe Riodinini. The species was first described by John O. Westwood in 1851.

Description
Upper surface of the wings is black, with numerous longitudinal streaks of metallic blue-green colours on the outer half. The undersides are black, with the basal half spotted with purple-pink and the outer half with black and white stripes. Forewings are large, subtriangular, while the hindwings are relatively small.

Distribution
This rare species is widespread in the tropical areas of the South America, particularly in Ecuador, Brazil (Acre, Amazonas, Mato Grosso), Bolivia, Peru and Colombia.

Habitat
Lyropteryx apollonia can be found in tropical rainforests, at an elevation of about

Subspecies
 Lyropteryx apollonia apollonia Stichel, 1910 (Brazil: Amazonas, Bolivia, Peru)
 Lyropteryx apollonia diana Stichel, 1910 (Colombia)
 Lyropteryx apollonia sparsa Stichel, 1924 (Brazil: Mato Grosso)

References
 
Doubleday, Edward & Westwood, John O. (1851). The Genera of Diurnal Lepidoptera.

External links
 "Blue-rayed Metalmark". Butterflies of the Amazon and Andes. Learn About Butterflies.
 "Lyropteryx apollonia Westwood, 1851". Insecta.pro.
 "Lyropteryx apollonia Westwood, 1851". BioLib.

Riodinidae
Butterflies described in 1851
Taxa named by John O. Westwood